MorphoSys AG is a biopharmaceutical company founded in 1992. The company is headquartered near Munich, Germany and has a wholly owned subsidiary, MorphoSys US Inc., in Boston MA in the US. The company has various antibody, protein and peptide technologies that it uses to discover and develop both proprietary and partnered drug candidates. The company has more than 100 drugs in its wider pipeline that are being investigated for a variety of diseases. While many of these are being developed in partnership with pharma and biotech companies, MorphoSys also has a proprietary pipeline with a focus on cancer and autoimmune diseases.  
 
MorphoSys AG is listed on the Frankfurt Stock Exchange and on the US Nasdaq stock exchange.

History
The Company was founded in 1992. In 1999, MorphoSys listed on the Frankfurt Stock Exchange under the ticker symbol "MOR".

In 2004, MorphoSys and Novartis entered into a strategic partnership for the research and development of biopharmaceuticals, which was expanded in 2007. Additional discovery partnerships included: Bayer (1999), Roche (2000), Centocor (now Janssen Biotech, 2000), Schering AG (2001) and Pfizer (2003).

In 2008, the company’s first proprietary antibody MOR103 (now otilimab) entered clinical development. Following the publication of promising results in rheumatoid arthritis, MorphoSys signed a license agreement with GlaxoSmithKline for otilimab. In 2019, GlaxoSmithKline initiated a phase 3 clinical development program with otilimab (now GSK3196165).

In 2010, MorphoSys signed a license agreement with Xencor Inc. for MOR208 (now tafasitamab).

In July 2017, the first of MorphoSys’ platform drugs received US marketing approval. Guselkumab (brand name Tremfya), which was developed and is being commercialized by Janssen Biotech a subsidiary of Johnson & Johnson, was first approved for the treatment of moderate-to-severe plaque psoriasis in the United States, the European Union and Canada.

In April 2018, following a US initial public offering in which the company raised $239 million, American depositary shares of MorphoSys began trading on the Nasdaq stock exchange, also under the symbol "MOR."

In 2018, the company established a wholly owned US subsidiary, MorphoSys US Inc..

In December 2019, based on positive clinical trial results, the company submitted a Biologics License Application (BLA) to the FDA for tafasitamab in combination with lenalidomide for the treatment of relapsed/refractory diffuse large B-cell lymphoma. The submission was accepted for filing in February 2020, and a decision on the filing is expected in August 2020.

In January 2020, MorphoSys and Incyte Corporation signed a collaboration and license agreement for the global development and commercialization of tafasitamab. On March 3, 2020, the agreement received antitrust clearance and thus became effective.

In March 2020, MorphoSys announced that the FDA had accepted the Biologics License Application (BLA) for filing and granted priority review for tafasitamab, setting a Prescription Drug User Fee Act (PDUFA) goal date of August 30, 2020.

On July 31, 2020, Monjuvi (tafasitamab-cxix) was approved by the U.S. FDA in combination with lenalidomide for the medical treatment of adult patients with relapsed or refractory diffuse large B-cell lymphoma (DLBCL) not otherwise specified, including DLBCL arising from low grade lymphoma, and who are not eligible for autologous stem cell transplant (ASCT).

Pipeline
As of December 2020, MorphoSys had 116 drug candidates which are developed by MorphoSys and other pharmaceutical companies, 28 of which were in clinical development. Two antibodies developed by MorphoSys are already approved and marketed. 

Tafasitamab (MOR208) is a humanized monoclonal antibody directed against CD19 in clinical development for the treatment of B-cell malignancies. Tafasitamab is being evaluated in several clinical trials, alone and in combination with other anti-cancer drugs.

Felzartamab (MOR202)is a humanized monoclonal antibody directed against CD38 for the treatment of anti-PLA2R-positive membranous nephropathy, an autoimmune disease affecting the kidneys. In 2017, MorphoSys entered into a regional licensing agreement with I-Mab Biopharma to develop and commercialize Felzartamab (called TJ202 by I-Mab) in Greater China. Felzartamab (MOR202/TJ202) is currently under investigation by I-Mab in three clinical trials.

Otilimab (MOR103/GSK3196165) is a fully human monoclonal antibody directed against GM-CSF. The program is outlicensed to GlaxoSmithKline. Otilimab is currently under investigation in a Phase 3 trial in rheumatoid arthritis that started in July 2019.
On March 2nd, 2023, MorphoSys announced that the company would end its preclinical research programs and cease all related activities. According to the press release, this step is justified by challenges in the pharmaceutical market, which are forcing the company to optimize its cost structure and to focus all resources more on oncology products in the mid to late stage of development.

Technology

MorphoSys has discovered a number of antibody technologies that are use for drug development.

MorphoSys’ main technology is HuCAL (Human Combinatorial Antibody Library), which is a collection of more than ten billion fully human antibodies in the form of a phage display bank and a system for their optimization.

Another technology recently developed is the OkapY bispecific antibody technology. MorphoSys’ OkapY technology is a new proprietary “2+1” bispecific antibody format with the hysicochemical properties to simplify the development and large-scale production of such molecules.

References

External links

MorphoSys US Inc.
Xencor Inc.
I-Mab Biopharma
Lanthio Pharma B.V.

Biotechnology companies of Germany
Biotechnology companies established in 1992
1992 establishments in Germany
Companies in the TecDAX
Companies in the MDAX